Abbas Laibi Munshid (born 1952) is an Iraqi former sprinter who competed in the 1980 Summer Olympics.

References

1952 births
Living people
Iraqi male sprinters
Olympic athletes of Iraq
Athletes (track and field) at the 1980 Summer Olympics
Iraqi male athletes
Asian Games medalists in athletics (track and field)
Athletes (track and field) at the 1978 Asian Games
Athletes (track and field) at the 1982 Asian Games
Asian Games gold medalists for Iraq
Asian Games silver medalists for Iraq
Asian Games bronze medalists for Iraq
Medalists at the 1978 Asian Games
Medalists at the 1982 Asian Games